James Harden (born 1989) is an American basketball player.

James Harden may also refer to:

People
James Richard Edwards Harden or Richard Harden (1916–2000), Northern Irish politician
James Richard Harden or Rich Harden (born 1981), Canadian baseball player
Jim Harden (soccer), Australian international soccer player
James Harden, wrongly convicted teen in Dixmoor 5

Fictional characters
Sheriff Jim Harden, character in the 1950 western film The Bandit Queen

See also
James Harden-Hickey (1854–1898), Franco-American author
James Harden Daugherty, African-American soldier in World War II
James Harden Hays or James H. Hayes (1800–1876), American coal miner
James Hardin (disambiguation)